Richard Meade (1937–2015) was a British Olympic equestrian gold medalist.

Richard Meade may also refer to:
Richard Meade, 2nd Earl of Clanwilliam (1766–1805), Irish peer
Richard Meade, 3rd Earl of Clanwilliam (1795–1879), British ambassador
Richard Meade, 4th Earl of Clanwilliam (1832–1907), British Royal Navy officer and peer
Richard Kidder Meade (colonel) (1746–1805), George Washington aide-de-camp 
Richard Kidder Meade (1803–1862), Virginia lawyer, plantation owner and politician
Richard Henry Meade (1814–1899), English surgeon and entomologist
Richard John Meade (1821–1894), British Indian Army general
Richard Worsam Meade I (1778–1828), American merchant and art collector
Richard Worsam Meade II (1807–1870), United States Navy officer
Richard Worsam Meade III (1837–1897), United States Navy officer
Sir Richard Meade (judge). British High Court judge

See also
Richard Mead (1673–1754), English physician
Richie Meade (born c. 1955), American lacrosse coach